The San Francisco Shock are an American esports team founded in 2017 that compete in the Overwatch League (OWL). The Shock began playing competitive Overwatch in the 2018 season.

All signed players during all OWL seasons (including the playoffs) are included, even if they did not make an appearance.

All-time roster

References

External links 
 San Francisco Shock roster

 
San Francisco Shock
San Francisco